The Landdros moss frog (Arthroleptella landdrosia) is a species of frog in the family Pyxicephalidae.

It is endemic to South Africa.
Its natural habitats are Mediterranean-type shrubby vegetation and rivers.
It is threatened by habitat loss.

References

Arthroleptella
Endemic amphibians of South Africa
Amphibians described in 2000
Taxonomy articles created by Polbot